The Hand at the Window is a 1918 American silent mystery film directed by Raymond Wells and starring Joe King, Margery Wilson and Francis McDonald.

Cast
 Joe King as Roderick Moran 
 Margery Wilson as Laura Bowers 
 Francis McDonald as Tony Brachieri 
 Irene Hunt as The Calabrian Kid 
 Aaron Edwards as O'Brien 
 Arthur Millett as Inspector

References

Bibliography
 Ken Wlaschin. Silent Mystery and Detective Movies: A Comprehensive Filmography. McFarland, 2009.

External links
 

1918 films
1918 mystery films
American silent feature films
American mystery films
American black-and-white films
Triangle Film Corporation films
Films directed by Raymond Wells
1910s English-language films
1910s American films
Silent mystery films